Just Sue Me is an American romantic comedy starring Tom Arnold, William McNamara, Lori Heuring, Randall Batinkoff, Noëlle Balfour and contemporary swing band The Lucky Strikes, who appear during a performance scene in the film, and directed by John Shepphird.

Plot
The film tells the story of a law clerk juggling romance and work while tracking down the owner of an art gallery in order to settle a claim.

Release
It was released in the United States on September 16, 2000, at the Temecula Valley International film festival.

External links 
"Just Sue Me" IMDB page
Official website for Director John Shepphird

2000 films
2000s English-language films